Dynamite Allen is a lost 1921 American silent adventure film produced and distributed by the Fox Film Corporation. It was directed by Dell Henderson and stars athletic George Walsh.

Cast
George Walsh as Dynamite Allen
Edna Murphy as Betty Reed
Dorothy Allen as Jenny Allen
Carola Parsons as Sue Bennett
Byron Douglas as Bull Snide
Jack Baston as Howard Morton (credited as J. Thornton Baston)
Nellie Parker Spaulding as Mrs. Roger Pitney
Lettie Ford as Mrs. Sid Allen
Brigham Royce as Sid Allen
Frank Nelson as Lawyer Smoot
Billy Gilbert as Simp Hallett

See also
1937 Fox vault fire

References

External links

Lantern slide (WaybackMachine)

1921 films
American silent feature films
Fox Film films
1921 adventure films
American black-and-white films
Lost American films
American adventure films
Films directed by Dell Henderson
1921 lost films
1920s American films
Silent adventure films
1920s English-language films